This is a list of islands in the Black Sea.

Bulgaria 
 Ambelits Island, bay of Lozenets
 , in Arapya Bay
 Crocodile Island (in Stomoplo Bay
 St. Anastasia Island, in Atiya Bay
 St. Cyricus Island , bay of Sozopol (with artificial connection to Sozopol)
 St. Ivan Island, bay of Sozopol
 St. Peter Island, bay of Sozopol
 St. Thomas Island (Snake Island), bay of Arkoutino

Romania 
K Island - divided with Ukraine
Sacalin Island
Insula Sulinei

Russia

Turkey 

Giresun Island
Kefken Island

Tavşan Islet

Ukraine 

 , pair of rocks near Gurzuf, Crimea
 Berezan Island
 Dovhyi Island and smaller Kruhly, Velyky and Konsky islands in the Yahorlyk Bay
 Dzharylgach Island - the largest one in the Black Sea (56 km2)
 ,  and others in the Karkinit Bay, east of Dzharylgach
 Nova Zemlya (Нова Земля) - divided with Romania
 , Yahorlyk Islands, Siberian Islands, Babyn Island and a few others in the Gulf of Tendra
Snake Island
  in Karkinit Bay, off northwestern Crimean coast
 Tendra Spit, a spit which is separated into several islands.
 , rocks south of Opuk Cape, Kerch peninsula
 A few islets just outside the Danube delta

Islands in the numerous estuaries:
  in the Dnieper Estuary, south of Ochakiv
 Yanushev Island, Verbky Islands, Tendra Island and other along the southern coast of the Dnieper Estuary

See also 
 List of islands

References

Black Sea